Ampasibe Onibe is a rural commune in the district of Toamasina II (district), in the region of Atsinanana, on the northern part of the east coast of Madagascar.

Economy
The economy is based on agriculture.

References

Populated places in Atsinanana